Rosemarie was a German fishing trawler that was requisitioned in the Second World War by the Kriegsmarine for use as a Vorpostenboot, serving as V 310 Rosemarie. She was returned to her owners post-war and served until 1952.

Description
The engine was built by Seebeckwerft, Wesermünde, Germany. It was rated at 64nhp.

History
Rosemarie was built as yard number 460 by G. Seebeck AG, Wesermünde, Germanay for the Hochseefischerei J. Wieting AG Bremerhaven. She was launched in September 1924  and completed in November. The Code Letters QVED were allocated, as was the fishing boat registration BX 173. On 16 June 1930, her registration was changed to ON 124. On 4 September 1934, her registration was changed to PG 461. She was sold to the Nordsee Deutsche Hochseefischerei Bremen-Cuxhaven AG on 10 November 1934. Her port of registry was changed to Nordenham. In 1934 her Code Letters were changed to DNOG.

On 29 April 1941, Rosemarie was requistioned by the Kriegsmarine for use as a vorpostenboot. She was allocated to 3 Vorpostenflotille, serving as V 310 Rosemarie. On 18 April 1945, she was returned to her owners. In 1948, her registration was changed to BX 335. She was sold for breaking in Hamburg on 31 December 1952.

References

Sources

1924 ships
Ships built in Bremen (state)
Fishing vessels of Germany
Steamships of Germany
World War II merchant ships of Germany
Auxiliary ships of the Kriegsmarine
Steamships of West Germany
Fishing vessels of West Germany